In molecular biology, 5' ureB sRNA is a small RNA. It is located at the 5' end of the ureB gene in the urease gene cluster, and is antisense to ureB. Its expression is regulated by the arsS/arsR two-component regulatory system, arsS downregulates 5' ureB sRNA expression under acidic conditions leading to an increase in ureB expression. 5' ureB sRNA suppresses transcription of ureA and ureB by base-pairing with  mRNA resulting in premature termination of the transcript to the 5' of ureB.

See also
Bacterial small RNA

References

RNA
Non-coding RNA